Mikhail Youzhny was the defending champion but chose not to defend his title.

Janko Tipsarević won the title after defeating Blaž Kavčič 6–3, 7–6(7–1) in the final.

Seeds

Draw

Finals

Top half

Bottom half

References
Main Draw
Qualifying Draw

Singles
Bangkok Challenger - Singles
 in Thai tennis